Events from the year 1569 in Sweden

Incumbents
 Monarch – John III

Events

 26 January - The deposition of Eric XIV in favor of John III is formally confirmed by the royal council. 
 10 July - Coronation of John III and Catherine Jagiellon. 
 24 October - Sweden invades the Danish province of Scania.
 29 October - Sweden conquer Åhus. 
 October - Denmark-Norway besieges Varberg.
 13 November - Peace negotiations between Sweden and Denmark in Knäred.
 4 December - Denmark-Norway conquers Varberg. 
 Armistice between Sweden and Denmark-Norway in Estonia. 
 The 1569 Plot, a conspiracy to free the deposed king from prison is discovered and the conspirators are executed.

Births

 5 November - Nils Turesson Bielke, statesman, member of the privy council  (died 1639)

Deaths

 - Elin Andersdotter, conspirator (born unknown date)
 - Thomas Jakobsson, conspirator (born unknown date)

References

 
Years of the 16th century in Sweden
Sweden